Kamogata may refer to:

Kamogata, Okayama, a former town in Asakuchi District, Okayama Prefecture, Japan
Kamogata Station, a railway station in Asakuchi, Okayama Prefecture, Japan
9293 Kamogata, a main-belt asteroid